St. Mary's High School is a secondary school in Calgary, Alberta, Canada. It is operated by the Calgary Catholic School District (CCSD). The school is well known in Calgary for its historical significance. It attracts significant numbers of students from throughout the city, even those closer to other Catholic high schools, who wish to take advantage of programs not offered in their local high school. Also, for some, it is a tradition to attend the same school as their parents and grandparents.

History
St. Mary's is the oldest school in Calgary that is still in operation (the school, not the current building, which is relatively new). It was the first Catholic school, in what's now Alberta, to receive full public financial support. The history of St. Mary's School is a major part of the history of publicly funded Catholic education in the Calgary area.

1909–1956
With the construction of a new building, St. Mary's serves as the hub of the district for decades (even with new schools built). Throughout much of this time, the number of young families in the area continues to grow (tapering off later on).

1957 – present
In modern times St. Mary's no longer plays a central role in the district. The number of young families in the area declines (as they move to suburbs) and school progressively relies more on students coming from across the city (outside the immediate area).

St. Mary's High School at the 111 – 18 Avenue S.W. location remains an active senior high school, teaching grades ten to twelve. Generally, students from all the "St Mary's" school buildings, are considered alumni of the school, which is seen as a single historical institution, which happened to have multiple buildings over time.

Special programs
St. Mary's High School is one of a small number of Calgary high schools to offer an International Baccalaureate (IB) Diploma Programme, which it started in 1986.
The school is also part of the Action for Bright Children Society.

Sports
Extracurricular sports:
Team sports:  Football, Basketball, Volleyball, Soccer, Field hockey, Rugby
Individual sports:  Badminton, Track and field, Cross country, Swimming/Diving

See also
St. Mary's Cathedral – Located near the school.
Western Canada High School – The closest public high school.

References

Restoration of St. Mary's School – Information at Alberta Heritage on past efforts to restore the 1909 building (before its ultimate demolition).
Rouleauville at Glenbow Museum – Information on the history of the French-speaking village.
Rouleauville at Alberta Heritage – Discusses Father Lacombe and the village. 
Calgary Public Library photo of 1909 building 
Cornerstones: St. Mary's School – Greater detail on the school's history.
St. Mary's Girls' School at Faithful Companions of Jesus

External links
Official site of St. Mary's High School

Catholic secondary schools in Alberta
Educational institutions established in 1885
High schools in Calgary
International Baccalaureate schools in Alberta
1885 establishments in the Northwest Territories